The 1969–70 FIBA European Cup Winners' Cup was the fourth edition of FIBA's 2nd-tier level European-wide professional club basketball competition, contested between national domestic cup champions, running from 4 December 1969, to 26 April 1970. It was contested by 20 teams, two less than in the two previous editions.

Fides Napoli defeated JA Vichy, in a two-legged final, to become the competition's second Italian League champion.

Participants

First round

|}

Second round

|}

Automatically qualified to the quarter finals
 Dinamo Tbilisi

Quarterfinals

|}

Semifinals

|}

Finals

|}

References

External links 
FIBA European Cup Winner's Cup 1969–70 linguasport.com
FIBA European Cup Winner's Cup 1969–70

Cup
FIBA Saporta Cup